In medicine, some blood tests are conducted on capillary blood obtained by fingerstick (or fingerprick) (or, for neonates, by an analogous heelprick). The site, free of surface arterial flow, where the blood is to be collected is sterilized with a topical germicide, and the skin pierced with a sterile lancet. After a droplet has formed, capillary blood is captured in a capillary tube (usually relying on surface tension). Blood cells drawn from fingersticks have a tendency to undergo hemolysis, especially if the finger is "milked" to obtain more blood.


Uses 
Tests commonly conducted on the capillary blood collected are:
 Glucose levels – Diabetics often have a portable blood meter to check on their blood sugar.
 Mononucleosis – Fingerstick testing can be used to test for mononucleosis.
 Hemoglobin levels – Fingerstick testing of hemoglobin is a quick screening procedure to ensure a blood or plasma donor has an acceptably high blood count for donating blood or blood components.
 Genetic testing – Heelprick testing of a newborn's DNA allows for early diagnosis and mitigation of common hereditary disorders.
 CBC
 Prothrombin time

Fingersticks are routine for hardy adults, but are generally performed on children and the elderly only if a small amount of blood suffices for needed tests. Neonates are given heelpricks instead, as this is less likely to cause permanent damage.

References

External links 
 Heelpricks, section "Blood collection on babies"

Blood tests